Neftçi may refer to:

People
 Nermin Neftçi (1924–2003), Turkish female lawyer, politician and former government minister. Mother of Salih Neftçi
 Salih Neftçi (1947–2009), Turkish financial economist. Son of Nermin Neftçi

Other uses
 Neftçi PFK, an Azerbaijani football club
 FC Neftchi Fergana, an Uzbekistani football club
 FC Neftchi Kochkor-Ata, a Kyrgyz football club